Sitaram Mahato is a Nepalese Politician, former state minister and serving as the Member Of House Of Representatives (Nepal) elected from Sunsari-2, Province No. 1. He is member of the Nepali Congress.

References

Living people
Nepali Congress politicians from Koshi Province
Nepal MPs 2017–2022
Members of the 2nd Nepalese Constituent Assembly
Nepali Congress (Democratic) politicians
1955 births